Felixburg is a village in the Masvingo Province of Zimbabwe. It was named after Felix Posselt who visited the area in 1888 and later settled at Felixsburg.

Populated places in Masvingo Province